Centaur and Nymph (German: Kentaur und Nymphe) is an 1888 bronze sculpture by Reinhold Begas, installed in the Kolonnadenhof outside the Alte Nationalgalerie in Berlin, Germany.

See also

 1888 in art

External links
 

1888 establishments in Germany
1888 sculptures
Bronze sculptures in Germany
Centaurs
Outdoor sculptures in Berlin
Sculptures of classical mythology
Statues in Germany
Works by German people